The Canvey Island Independent Party (CIIP) is a local political party active on Canvey Island, in Essex, England. It was established in 2004 to campaign for a separate district council for Canvey Island.

Background

Canvey Island became a single civil parish in 1881, replacing 17 former divisions that had existed in broadly the same form since the Norman era. In 1926, the parish was converted to the Canvey Island Urban District, which governed the island as a distinct entity. The urban district was dissolved along with the mainland Benfleet Urban District in the Local Government Act 1972 to form the  local government district and borough of Castle Point, ending Canvey Island's existence as a separate entity in local government.

The Canvey Island Independents were established in 2004 to campaign for a return to Canvey Island's autonomy, which had been abolished 32 years previously. They argued that the current local government arrangements – which saw more councillors elected to the borough council from the mainland – were unfair to the residents of Canvey Island. They also campaigned for more power to be devolved to Canvey Island Town Council, a parish council subordinate to Castle Point which is responsible for limited services and facilities and on the island.

Election results

Since its formation the Canvey Island Independent Party has contested elections on a yearly basis, with representation at borough and county council level. It is also active at the parish level, with Canvey Island Independents sitting on Canvey Island Town Council. The party does not contest Parliamentary elections.

Borough Council elections

The Canvey Island Independents have been represented continuously on Castle Point Borough Council since their first election in 2004. They were consistently the second-largest group on the council, behind the ruling Conservatives until the 2022 elections, in which they came in first place after the Conservatives lost 6 seats.

County council elections 

The Canvey Island Independents have been represented on Essex County Council since the 2009 election, having failed to secure either seat on Canvey Island at the elections in 2005. They won both Canvey Island seats at the 2021 election.

References

External links
Canvey Island Independent Party

Locally based political parties in England